Engels Maps is a map company in the Ohio Valley with particular concentration on the Cincinnati-Dayton region. It also produces chamber of commerce maps.

Publications

It has three semi-annual publications that form its foundation:
Cincinnati Engels Guide
Dayton Engels Guide
Indianapolis Engels Guide
Their maps are also found in the Cincinnati Bell Yellow Pages and the Dayton WorkBook.

Corporate history 
Engels Maps was founded by Judson Engels in 1994.

Sources

External links
Engels Maps
http://cincinnati.citysearch.com/profile/4343456/fort_thomas_ky/engels_maps_guide.html
Target Marketing 
http://www.macraesbluebook.com/search/company.cfm?company=838024
http://engelsmaps.com engelsmaps.com

Geodesy
Companies based in Kentucky
Software companies based in Kentucky
American  companies established in 1994
Map companies of the United States
Campbell County, Kentucky
1994 establishments in Kentucky
Software companies of the United States

Software companies established in 1994